This page gathers the results of elections in politics of Friuli-Venezia Giulia.

Regional elections

Latest regional election

In the latest regional election, which took place on 4 March 2018, Massimiliano Fedriga of the Lega Nord Friuli-Venezia Giulia was elected by a landslide President.

List of previous regional elections
1964 Friuli-Venezia Giulia regional election
1968 Friuli-Venezia Giulia regional election
1973 Friuli-Venezia Giulia regional election
1978 Friuli-Venezia Giulia regional election
1983 Friuli-Venezia Giulia regional election
1988 Friuli-Venezia Giulia regional election
1993 Friuli-Venezia Giulia regional election
1998 Friuli-Venezia Giulia regional election
2003 Friuli-Venezia Giulia regional election
2008 Friuli-Venezia Giulia regional election
2013 Friuli-Venezia Giulia regional election

Italian general elections in Friuli-Venezia Giulia

Latest general election

List of previous general elections
1946 Italian general election in Friuli-Venezia Giulia
1948 Italian general election in Friuli-Venezia Giulia
1953 Italian general election in Friuli-Venezia Giulia
1958 Italian general election in Friuli-Venezia Giulia
1963 Italian general election in Friuli-Venezia Giulia
1968 Italian general election in Friuli-Venezia Giulia
1972 Italian general election in Friuli-Venezia Giulia
1976 Italian general election in Friuli-Venezia Giulia
1979 Italian general election in Friuli-Venezia Giulia
1983 Italian general election in Friuli-Venezia Giulia
1987 Italian general election in Friuli-Venezia Giulia
1992 Italian general election in Friuli-Venezia Giulia
1994 Italian general election in Friuli-Venezia Giulia
1996 Italian general election in Friuli-Venezia Giulia
2001 Italian general election in Friuli-Venezia Giulia
2006 Italian general election in Friuli-Venezia Giulia
2008 Italian general election in Friuli-Venezia Giulia
2013 Italian general election in Friuli-Venezia Giulia

European Parliament elections in Friuli-Venezia Giulia

Latest European Parliament election

List of previous European Parliament elections
1979 European Parliament election in Friuli-Venezia Giulia
1984 European Parliament election in Friuli-Venezia Giulia
1989 European Parliament election in Friuli-Venezia Giulia
1994 European Parliament election in Friuli-Venezia Giulia
1999 European Parliament election in Friuli-Venezia Giulia
2004 European Parliament election in Friuli-Venezia Giulia
2009 European Parliament election in Friuli-Venezia Giulia
2014 European Parliament election in Friuli-Venezia Giulia

 
Politics of Friuli-Venezia Giulia